Berthe Bovy (6 January 1887 – 26 February 1977), sometimes known as Betty Bovy, was a Belgian actress who appeared in theatre, films and television programmes for over 60 years.

Biography 
Born Berthe Marguerite Jeanne Bovy, she was the daughter of poet and journalist Théophile Bovy, she was born in Cheratte, now part of the commune of Visé, in the province of Liège. Seemingly interested in acting from an early age, an interest which her father encouraged, she enrolled in the  Koninklijk Conservatorium in Brussels following a meeting with Sarah Bernhardt. From 1904 to 1906 she studied at the CNSAD in Paris. She joined the Comédie-Française in 1907.

She was married and divorced three times, first to Charles Gribouval, secretary of the Comédie-Française, secondly with artist Ion Anton Ion-Don, and thirdly, in 1929, with Pierre Jules Louis Laudenbach, better known by his stage name Pierre Fresnay. She died at Montgeron in France and is buried in the city of Liège.

Filmography

1908: The Assassination of the Duke of Guise (Short) - Le page
1910: On ne badine pas avec l'amour (Short) - Camille
1911: Le roman d'une pauvre fille
1912: La conquête du bonheur - Suzette Robert
1913: Coeur de femme - Marie-Claire de la Salette
1913: Le fils de Lagardère - Bathilde de Wendel
1913: Le baiser suprême
1913: Le Roman de Carpentier (Short)
1921: The Earth - La Trouille
1938: Le Joueur - Babouchka
1939: Je t'attendrai - Mme Marchand - La mère de Paul
1942: The Beautiful Adventure - Madame de Trévillac
1945: Boule de Suif - Madame Bonnet
1948: The Last Vacation - Tante Délie
1948: L'ombre - Mme Fournier
1948: D'homme à hommes - La mère de Dunant
1948: L'Armoire volante - Madame Lea Lobligeois
1949: Fantomas Against Fantomas - La vieille dame
1950: La Souricière - Mlle Germaine
1951: La Maison Bonnadieu - Madame Ramadin - la grand-mère
1954: On Trial - La grand-mère
1956: Le Secret de sœur Angèle - La supérieure de Paris
1957: Bonjour Toubib - Madame Cohen
1962: Mon oncle du Texas - La grand-mère Elisa
1967: Le dimanche de la vie - Nanette
1971: Aussi loin que l'amour - Une invitée (final film role)

References
  Pasleau, Suzy, BOVY, Berthe, in Éliane Gubin, Catherine Jacques, Valérie Piette & Jean Puissant (eds), Dictionnaire des femmes belges: XIXe et XXe siècles. Bruxelles: Éditions Racine, 2006.

External links

 

1887 births
1977 deaths
Belgian stage actresses
Belgian film actresses
Belgian silent film actresses
20th-century Belgian actresses
Sociétaires of the Comédie-Française
French National Academy of Dramatic Arts alumni